Hyaloplaga is a monotypic moth genus of the family Crambidae described by William Warren in 1892. It contains only one species, Hyaloplaga pulchralis, described by Frederic Moore in 1867, which is found in Darjeeling, India.

References

Acentropinae
Monotypic moth genera
Moths of Asia
Crambidae genera
Taxa named by William Warren (entomologist)